The Radomiro Tomic mine is an open pit mine that extracts copper oxide minerals at  above sea level in the Andes mountains near to Chuquicamata mine and Calama in northern Chile's Antofagasta Region.

Although this deposit was discovered in the 1950s, its operations started only in 1995, after Codelco updated the feasibility studies for its exploitation and acquired the technology necessary to exploit it profitably.

Today, Chilean Copper Corporation (Codelco) controls the mine. Until 1999, Radomiro Tomic was referred to as "Codelco Chile Division Radomiro Tomić", since then, (Codelco) has renamed it "Codelco Norte".

External links
 Codelco

Copper mines in Chile
Mines in Antofagasta Region
Open-pit mines
Surface mines in Chile